Leonardo Ruiz Pineda, (28 September 1916, Rubio, Táchira, - 21 October 1952, Caracas) was a Venezuelan lawyer and politician, member and one of the founders of the party Acción Democrática (AD), of which was Secretary General and leader of the clandestine resistance between 1949 and 1952 against the dictatorship of Marcos Pérez Jiménez.

Ruiz Pineda was appointed Governor of Táchira in 1946 under Romulo Betancourt, and Minister of Communications in February 1948 in the government of Romulo Gallegos. During the 1948 Venezuelan coup d'état he was arrested, and imprisoned for six months. After his release he became Secretary General of Democratic Action in September 1949, succeeding Octavio Lepage, leading the clandestine resistance movement against the military dictatorship. On 21 October 1952 he was assassinated by police in Caracas.

See also
History of Venezuela
Politics of Venezuela

References

External links
  Leonardo Ruiz Pineda

People from Caracas
20th-century Venezuelan lawyers
Venezuelan democracy activists
Assassinated Venezuelan politicians
People murdered in Venezuela
1916 births
1952 deaths
Democratic Action (Venezuela) politicians
People shot dead by law enforcement officers
Venezuelan prisoners and detainees
Communications ministers of Venezuela